Schliemann most often refers to:
 Heinrich Schliemann (1822–1890), German pioneer in archaeology

Schliemann may also refer to:

People
 Agamemnon Schliemann (1878–1954), Greek ambassador to the United States, son of Heinrich
 Christian Schliemann (born 1962), German field hockey player
 Luise Therese Sophie Schliemann (1793–1831) mother of Heinrich Schliemann

Other uses
 Schliemann Defence, an opening in the game of chess
 Schliemann Gold (aka Priam's Treasure), a cache of gold and artifacts discovered by Heinrich Schliemann
 3302 Schliemann, a main-belt asteroid
 Schliemann (crater), a lunar impact crater on the far side of the Moon

Surnames of German origin